John Alexander Knolla (March 19, 1919 – January 12, 1992) was a  National Football League player for the Chicago Cardinals.  He played college football for Creighton University from 1938 to 1940. In 1940, he led all NCAA major college players with 1,420 yards of total offense, outpacing Tom Harmon by 52 yards.  He also played professional football in the National Football League for the Chicago Cardinals in 1942 and 1945. He appeared in 18 NFL games and gained 138 kickoff return yards, 107 punt return yards, 79 rushing yards, and 63 receiving yards.

See also
 List of NCAA major college football yearly total offense leaders

References

1919 births
1992 deaths
American football halfbacks
Creighton Bluejays football players
Chicago Cardinals players
Players of American football from Chicago